Piletocera ochrosema is a moth in the family Crambidae. It was described by Edward Meyrick in 1886. It is found on Vanuatu and Fiji.

References

ochrosema
Moths described in 1886
Moths of Oceania